Schistura deansmarti is a species of ray-finned fish in the stone loach genus Schistura. It is found in cave streams in a karst landscape in the Thung Salaeng Luang National Park of Phitsanulok Province where it lives mainly on the stream beds and feeds on organic material and micro-organisms. The specific name honors the British speleologist who collected the original specimens and who works for the conservation of caves in Thailand.

References 

D
Fish described in 2003
Taxa named by Chavalit Vidthayanon